OTO Award Music Band

Currently held by  IMT Smile

First awarded  | Last awarded 2013 | Present 

OTO Award for Music Band has been awarded since the 2013, established by Art Production Agency (APA) in Slovakia. The award is presented to the most recognized music band of the past year with the ceremony permitted live by the national television network STV.

Winners and nominees

2010s

Superlatives

References

External links
 OTO Awards (Official website)
 OTO Awards - Winners and nominees (From 2000 onwards)
 OTO Awards - Winners and nominees (From 2000 to 2009)

Music band
Slovak culture
Slovak television awards
Awards established in 2000